Isaac Modi (born 26 January 2004) is an English footballer who plays as a midfielder for  club Oldham Athletic.

Career
Modi grew up in Wythenshawe and joined Oldham Athletic's academy at under-13 level. After impressing for Oldham's youth team in the FA Youth Cup, Modi was handed his first-team debut as a late substitute in a 3–1 home defeat to Swindon Town on 30 October 2021. Modi joined National League North club Curzon Ashton on loan in December 2021. He made his debut as a substitute in a 4–3 defeat to Chorley on 28 December.

Career statistics

References

External links

2004 births
Living people
English footballers
Association football midfielders
Oldham Athletic A.F.C. players
Curzon Ashton F.C. players
English Football League players
Trafford F.C. players